The smalleye lanternshark (Etmopterus litvinovi) is a shark of the family Etmopteridae found in the southeast Pacific off Peru and Chile, at depths between .

Reproduction is ovoviviparous.

The shark appears to be endemic to two areas. The Nazca ridge and the Sala y Gomez ridge.

References

 
 Compagno, Dando, & Fowler, Sharks of the World, Princeton University Press, New Jersey 2005 

Etmopterus
Fish described in 1990